IObit Uninstaller is an application for Microsoft Windows developed by IObit Inc. The software is an uninstall utility, which extends the method of uninstalling in Windows OS. It removes programs, a toolbar, and some leftover registry entries or browser plugins.

Features
 
It can:

• Detect and remove malicious and ad-based plug-ins for a more secure online experience.

• Get rid of bundled items simultaneously when uninstalling the main programs. Stubborn programs also can be easily removed.

• Automatically clean leftovers of uninstalled programs that other uninstallers cannot delete.

• Uninstall unwanted programs easily and quickly.
Get rid of bundled programs and plug-ins while uninstalling the main program.

• Remove stubborn programs.

• Remove malicious plug-ins.

• Remove advertising plug-ins.

• Uninstall the latest Universal Windows Platform Apps on Win 10.

• Uninstall Windows Apps even under the non-administrative account.

See also

References
 'IOBit Uninstaller: Better than Windows' Own', PCworld, 

 Official site

Reviews
 IObit Uninstaller Review at cNet
 IObit Uninstaller Review at v3.co.uk
 IObit Uninstaller Review at TechRadar

Freeware
Windows-only software
Uninstallers for Windows